Steve Sisco (born December 2, 1969) is a former Major League Baseball utility player who played in 2000 with the Atlanta Braves. He bats and throws right-handed. Sisco was drafted by the Kansas City Royals in the 16th round of the 1992 draft.

External links

1969 births
Living people
Major League Baseball outfielders
Baseball players from California
Atlanta Braves players
Cal State Fullerton Titans baseball players
Appleton Foxes players
Eugene Emeralds players
Omaha Royals players
Richmond Braves players
Rochester Red Wings players
Rockford Royals players
American expatriate baseball players in Mexico
Saraperos de Saltillo players
Scranton/Wilkes-Barre Red Barons players
Wichita Wranglers players
Wilmington Blue Rocks players
Anchorage Glacier Pilots players